The Sandpoint Federal Building, at 419 N. Second Ave. in Sandpoint, Idaho, was built in 1928. It was listed on the National Register of Historic Places in 2001.

The first floor was originally a post office, and was modified in the 1960s to serve as the East Bonner County Library.

Its architecture includes elements of Spanish Colonial Revival style, mostly in design details, and of Italian Renaissance Revival style, in its massing and symmetry. Both styles are rare in Idaho. Details include unglazed terra cotta ornamentation around window and door openings.

It was built by contractor W.D. Lovell.

References

Libraries in Idaho
Federal buildings in the United States
National Register of Historic Places in Bonner County, Idaho
Spanish Colonial Revival architecture in the United States
Italian Renaissance Revival architecture in the United States
Buildings and structures completed in 1928